Ianthopappus is a genus of South American flowering plants in the family Asteraceae.

Species
The only known species is  Ianthopappus corymbosus, native to Brazil (Rio Grande do Sul), Argentina (Corrientes) and Uruguay (Artigas).

References

Monotypic Asteraceae genera
Wunderlichioideae
Flora of South America